Broxburn railway station served the town of Broxburn, West Lothian, Scotland, from 1843 to 1849 on the Edinburgh and Glasgow Railway.

History 
The station was opened in August 1843 by the Edinburgh and Glasgow Railway. The first site was too distant from the town so it closed a year later in October 1844. The second site opened in June 1848, this time being situated less than a mile from the town. This didn't prove to be any better so it closed permanently on 12 November 1849.

References 

Disused railway stations in West Lothian
Railway stations in Great Britain opened in 1843
Railway stations in Great Britain closed in 1844
Railway stations in Great Britain opened in 1848
Railway stations in Great Britain closed in 1849
1843 establishments in Scotland
1849 disestablishments in Scotland